The Roman Catholic Archdiocese of Suiyuan/Hohhot is an archdiocese located in the city of Hohhot in China.

History
 December 21, 1883: Established as Apostolic Vicariate of Southwestern Mongolia 西南蒙古 from the Apostolic Vicariate of Mongolia 蒙古
 March 14, 1922: Renamed as Apostolic Vicariate of Suiyuan
 1946.04.11: Promoted as Metropolitan Archdiocese of Suiyuan 綏遠

Leadership
 Archbishops of Suiyuan (Roman rite)
 Archbishop Paul Meng Qinglu (2010–present) 
 Archbishop John Baptist Wang Xi-xian (1997 - 2005)
 Archbishop Francis Wang Xueming (王學明) (August 19, 1951 – February 10, 1997)
 Archbishop Louis Morel, C.I.C.M. (April 11, 1946 – August 19, 1951)
 Vicars Apostolic of Suiyuan 綏遠 (Roman Rite)
 Bishop Louis Morel, C.I.C.M. (later Archbishop) (March 21, 1938 – April 11, 1946)
 Bishop Louis van Dyck, C.I.C.M. (葛崇德) (August 10, 1915 – December 5, 1937)
 Vicars Apostolic of Southwestern Mongolia 西南蒙古 (Roman Rite)
 Bishop Alfons Bermyn, C.I.C.M. (闵玉清) (April 3, 1901 – February 16, 1915)
 Bishop Ferdinand Hamer, C.I.C.M. (韩默理) (1889–1900)
 Bishop Alfons De Vos, C.I.C.M. (德玉明) (1883–1889)

Suffragan dioceses
 Jining 集寧
 Ningxia 寧夏
 Xiwanzi 西彎子

Sources

 GCatholic.org
 Catholic Hierarchy

Roman Catholic dioceses in China
Religious organizations established in 1883
Religion in Inner Mongolia
Hohhot
Roman Catholic dioceses and prelatures established in the 19th century